North Hollywood High School (NHHS) is a public high school in the North Hollywood neighborhood of Los Angeles, California, United States. It is located in the San Fernando Valley and enrolls approximately 2,500 students. Several neighborhoods, including most of North Hollywood, Valley Village, Studio City and Sun Valley, send students to this school. NHHS is accredited by the Western Association of Schools and Colleges. The school principal is Ricardo Rosales.

Facilities
The campus facilities include three main buildings (Kennedy Hall, Frasier Hall and Randolph Hall), an agricultural area with livestock, a garden, an auditorium, a cafeteria, two gymnasiums, multiple computer labs with internet access, an auto mechanic shop, a wood shop, an instrumental music room, a football field, two softball fields, a baseball diamond, two tennis court areas, a teachers' parking lot, an art room, a college center, a parent center, a student store and a library.

History

Built in 1927, Lankershim High School was named for the town of Lankershim (first called Toluca, now North Hollywood) and its founding family. It opened with only a main building, auditorium, gymnasium and a shop and mechanics building, with 800 students, graduating its first class in 1928. The Board of Education was asked to employ teachers who were already residents of North Hollywood, creating jobs and education opportunities in the area. Lankershim High School was renamed North Hollywood High School in 1929. In 1937, a girls' gymnasium and a second major classroom building, now named Frasher Hall after former principal Roscoe Frasher, were built. In 1950, the third major classroom building, now named Randolph Hall, was built. In the 1950s, many smaller construction projects took place, including the agricultural classrooms, the boys' gymnasium, the home-side bleachers and the instrumental music room. In 1965, the main hall was named the John F. Kennedy Memorial Hall after the president. In 1966, the cafeteria, student store and two shop buildings were built. In 1973, the Amelia Earhart Continuation High School was built on the campus' northeast corner. In the late 1990s, thirteen modular buildings were installed to support an increase in the number of students.

It was in the Los Angeles City High School District until 1961, when it merged into LAUSD.

1990s and beyond
In 1996, the LAUSD board voted to move NHHS to a year-round schedule, but after more classroom space was found, the board reversed course. Several NHHS parents and community members did not want a year-round schedule since they feared it would negatively impact the Highly Gifted Magnet. According to the 1996 scheduling magnet, students were supposed to get July–May, which would have affected their ability to attend summer programs operated by Ivy League universities. The Zoo magnet students were to get the September–June schedule.

In 2000, Ramón C. Cortines, the LAUSD superintendent, stated that the overcrowding at NHHS was more severe than originally anticipated, and he announced that NHHS was going year-round. This was despite parents and students protesting against the move for several months. From 2000 to 2007, NHHS was a year-round school with three tracks.

In 2006, East Valley High School opened, relieving overcrowding at NHHS. In 2007, the traditional calendar was re-adopted and the students were divided into many Small Learning Communities (SLCs).  All but three of these were closed in June 2012.

In 2015, it was announced that NHHS was selected to undergo major renovations, including upgrading buildings and removing portable buildings, to be completed in five years.

In 2018, there was a proposal to co-locate a charter school, Valley International Preparatory High School (VIPHS), on the NHHS campus, but there was student opposition; students created an online petition to oppose the co-location.

Academics
NHHS contains three magnet programs; the Highly Gifted Magnet (HGM), the Zoo Magnet, and the STEM Magnet. There are also three Small Learning Communities (SLCs); the Humanitas School for Advanced Studies, the Home Engineering Academy, and the Freshmen Academy.

Highly Gifted Magnet
The Highly Gifted Magnet was established in 1989, and is a component of the voluntary integration program of the LAUSD, designed to provide an academically challenging college preparatory program. The program is designed to prepare its students to thrive in the most demanding of university environments. The students in the HGM are from all over Los Angeles, and have a variety of extracurricular interests, as well as diversity in their academic directions.

Children are eligible if they test in the 99.5th percentile or above on an intelligence test conducted by an LAUSD psychologist. Priority is given to children with 99.9%, officially “Highly Gifted” by LAUSD definition. If there are openings remaining in the program, “Gifted” students with 99.5%-99.8% may be admitted with priority based on magnet points. The program had 265 students, 4 administrators, and 7 faculty members in 2016.

Zoo Magnet

The Zoo Magnet was established in 1981, and is a specialized school that buses students to a small campus next to the Los Angeles Zoo in Griffith Park. At this site, approximately 300 students take standard classes such as history, math, and English, in addition to Advanced Placement classes related to biological and zoological sciences. Many of these classes include fieldwork in the Los Angeles Zoo and Botanical Gardens, Los Angeles River ecosystem, Autry National Center and the natural world of Griffith Park for tours and observation. Classes are on a block schedule, meeting three days a week for two hours per class.

STEM Magnet
The STEM Magnet was established in 2018, and is an alternative course of study that prepares students for college and career opportunities in Science, Technology, Engineering, and Math.

Small Learning Communities
The Small Learning Communities (SLCs) are intended to increase student achievement by personalizing the educational experience of students in large schools. Of the eight SLCs originally created, three remain as of 2019; the Humanitas School for Advanced Studies (HSAS), the Home Engineering Academy (HEA), and the Freshmen Academy (FA). The HSAS is designed for identified gifted, high achieving, high-ability students who show an interest in taking Honors and Advanced Placement courses. The HEA specializes in the construction and building trades.

Rankings
In 2022, U.S. News & World Report ranked NHHS as #1,349 in the country, #197 of CA High Schools, #92 in CA Metro Area High Schools, #13 in LAUSD, and gave it a College Readiness Index of 45.8/100.

In 2022, academicinfluence.com ranked NHHS as #32 in the country.

In 2022, Niche designated NHHS as #911 in the country, #26 in California, #17 in the Los Angeles area, and #15 in Los Angeles County. NHHS was awarded an overall grade of "A+", with an A in Academics, an A in Diversity, an A+ in Teachers, an A in College Prep, a B in Clubs and Activities, a B in Administration, a B− in Sports, a C in Food, and a C− in Resources and Facilities.

In 2022, schooldigger.com ranked NHHS as #416 of all high schools in California.

In 2020, Newsweek ranked NHHS as #2183 in the country for STEM programs, with a score of 63.6/100.

In 2018, the California Assessment of Student Performance and Progress evaluated 11th grade students in English and Mathematics. In the area of English, 11th grade students were classified as 15% standard not met, 17% standard nearly met, 32% standard met, and 36% standard exceeded. In the area of Math, 11th grade students were classified as 37% standard not met, 26% standard nearly met, 17% standard met, and 20% standard exceeded.

In 2017, The Washington Post ranked NHHS as 624th in the country, 77th of all high schools in California, 58th of all public high schools in California, 21st of all high schools in Los Angeles County, 11th of all high schools in LAUSD, and 1st of all high schools in District 2.

For the 2017-18 school year, the average ACT Test scores were a 25 in Reading, a 25 in English, a 24 in Math, and a 24 in Science, each out of 36 points.

In 2016, LAUSD's new School Quality Improvement Index scored NHHS's 2014-15 year as 80/100, broken down into 10.51/15 in Academic Performance English Language Arts (64% met or exceeded standards), 12.01/15 in Academic Performance Math (37% met or exceeded standards), 11.25/20 in Four Year Cohort Graduation Rate (85% graduated class of 2014), 3.7/5 in Five Year Cohort Graduation Rate (90% graduated class of 2013), 3.51/5 in Six Year Cohort Graduation Rate (89% graduated class of 2012), 12.68/13.33 in Chronic Absenteeism (6% chronically absent), 13.35/13.33 in Suspension Rates (0% suspended/expelled), and 13.33/13.33 in English Learner Re-Designation (21% re-designated).

In 2015, the Los Angeles Times gave NHHS a grade of "A" in arts education, ranking it 6th of all secondary schools, and 9th of all schools within LAUSD. Out of over 700 schools, only 35 received an "A" grade.

In 2014, Los Angeles Magazine ranked NHHS 14th in Los Angeles County, 7th of all public schools in the county, 4th of all LAUSD schools, and 1st in District 2.

In 2013, NHHS's Academic Performance Index (API) score was 778, which is 22 points below the state goal, but an improvement of 8 points since 2012.

For the 2013-14 school year, the average SAT Reasoning Test score was 1557 of a possible 2400 points.
 
For the 2013-14 school year, the California High School Exit Exam (CAHSEE) classified 84% of 10th graders in English and 83% of 10th graders in Mathematics, as "proficient or better".

For the 2014-15 school year, in the Physical Fitness Exam for 9th graders, 89.8% of students in Abdominal Strength, 65.5% of students in Aerobic Capacity, 63.1% of students in Body Composition, 91.2% of students in Flexibility, 92.1% of students in Trunk Extension Strength, and 80.9% of students in Upper Body Strength, were considered to be in the "Healthy Fitness Zone."

Advanced Placement Courses
NHHS offers 25 Advanced Placement courses in biology, calculus AB, calculus BC, chemistry, computer science A, computer science principles, English language and composition, English literature and composition, environmental science, European history, French language, human geography, macroeconomics, music theory, physics 2, physics C: electricity and magnetism, physics C: mechanics, psychology, Spanish language, Spanish literature, statistics, studio art, US government and politics, US history and world history.

For the 2019-20 school year, 793 students took 1,762 AP examinations, with 13% receiving a score of 1, 19% receiving a score of 2, 26% receiving a score of 3, 23% receiving a score of 4 and 19% receiving a score of 5.

Extracurricular 
There are a wide variety of extracurricular activities offered at NHHS. While many of these activities are provided by the school, after-school partnerships exist with Los Angeles Valley College (LAVC) and L.A.C.E.R. Afterschool Programs.

Competitive academics

NHHS offers many highly successful teams in competitive academics:
Academic Decathlon,
CyberPatriot,
DECA,
Duke Moot Court,
FIRST Robotics,
Future Farmers of America,
Mock Trial,
Model United Nations,
North American Computational Linguistics Open competition,
National Ocean Sciences Bowl,
Physics Olympiad,
Science Bowl,
Science Olympiad, and
Speech and Debate.

Sport

The NHHS Huskies compete in the CIF Los Angeles City Section's East Valley League. NHHS's rivals are Polytechnic High School and Ulysses S. Grant High School. The NHHS Athletics Department offers American football, archery, baseball, basketball (boys' and girls'), cheerleading, cross country, golf, soccer (boys' and girls'), softball (girls'), Students Run LA, tennis, track and field, ultimate frisbee, volleyball (boys' and girls') and weight training.

Performing arts

NHHS offers a wide variety of performing arts courses.

Marching Band - During the fall semester, the marching band is typically a Division 2A, 70-member ensemble called the Royal Regiment. The band performs as a pep band at football games and competes in field tournaments.
Concert Band - During the spring semester, the marching band becomes a concert band that performs at festivals, the annual Spring Concert, and various school events.
Percussion Ensemble - During the fall semester, the percussion ensemble prepares and performs for the annual Winter Concert.
Indoor Drumline - During the spring semester, the indoor drumline performs in drumline tournaments, the annual Spring Percussion Concert, and various school events. 
Advanced Jazz Band - Meeting before school during both semesters, the jazz band is an approximately 20-member ensemble that performs in festivals, the annual Winter Concert, the annual Spring Concert, and various events.
Beginning Guitar - During both semesters, beginning guitars is an introductory-level class for students with interest in guitar.
Color Guard - During the fall semester, the color guard teams up with the marching band to perform at football games and compete in field tournaments.
Dance Team - During the spring semester, the colorguard becomes a dance team that performs in competitions and the annual Spring Dance Show.

Demographics
For the 2021-22 school year, NHHS had a total enrollment of 2,555 students, with 8.5% English Learners, 0.2% homeless, 11.5% with disabilities, 0.4% foster youth, and 66.1% socioeconomically disadvantaged.

During the 2014-15 school year, the student-teacher ratio was 24 to 1, with 11 administrators, 114 teachers and 10 pupil services workers. Of the 114 teachers, one had a doctorate, 61 had master's degrees, 48 had bachelor's degrees and four were unreported.

Achievements

At the California Academic Decathlon, NHHS won 8th place in 2001, 4th place in 2002, 7th place in 2005, 9th place in 2006, 4th place in 2007, 5th place in 2008, 3rd place in 2009, 45th place in 2013, 46th place in 2014, 31st place in 2015, 51st place in 2016, 8th place in Division 3 in 2017, and 12th place in Division 2 in 2019.
At the Regional Science Bowl, NHHS has won 1st place every year since 1998, missing only 2005 and 2014. At the National Science Bowl, NHHS won 1st place in 2001, 2nd place in 2006, 6th place in 2008, 10th place in 2009, 3rd place in 2010, 2nd place in 2012, 7th place in 2013, 5th place in 2016, 9th place in 2017, 2nd place in 2018, 3rd place in 2019, 4th place in 2020, and 1st place in 2021.
At the National Ocean Sciences Bowl's Los Angeles Surf Bowl, NHHS won 3rd place in 2012.
At the CSU Long Beach Math Day at the Beach, NHHS won 1st place in 2006, 2nd place in 2012, 5th place in 2013, and 4th place in 2014.
At the Regional FIRST Robotics Competition, NHHS's NohoRobo Team was a quarterfinalist and received the Rookie Inspiration Award in 2010, and was a 6th seed (of 66) semifinalist in 2015.
At the International Botball Competition, NHHS received the Outstanding Programming award and the Judges' Choice award in 2011. At the Greater Los Angeles Regional Botball Tournament, NHHS won 2nd place overall in 2017.
At the Duke Moot Court National Tournament, NHHS has won 1st place in 2009, 1st and 2nd place in 2010, was a semifinalist in 2012 and won 2nd place in 2016.
At the Constitutional Rights Foundation's Mock Trial State Competition, NHHS won 1st place in 1982 and 2nd place in 1983.
At the National Speech and Debate Association's district qualifier, NHHS's speech and debate team won sweepstakes in Congressional Debate in 2014. In three of California High School Speech Association's Tri-County Forensics League competitions, NHHS's team took sweepstakes in 2014. At the CHSSA's state championships, NHHS students won 10th and 11th in Congressional Debate.
At the CyberPatriot National Finals, NHHS won 4th and 6th place in 2013, 1st place in 2014, and 2nd and 5th place in 2015. At the California Cyber Innovation Challenge, NHHS won 1st place in 2016 and 2017. In 2017, three teams were sent to the national finals and one team won 1st place. In 2018, three teams were sent to the national finals and won 1st, 2nd, and 9th place. In 2019, NHHS won 2nd place in the Open Class Division.
The NHHS FFA chapter was ranked a "Superior Chapter" by the California FFA Association in 1951, 1953, 1954, 1957, 1958, 1959, 1960, 1963, 1967, 1980, 1989, and 1990. At the Los Angeles FFA Horticulture Contest, NHHS teams won 1st place in both Advanced Horticulture and Floral Horticulture in 2015.
At the Southern California DECA Conference, NHHS won 1st and 2nd place in marketing, and 1st place in business law and ethics in 2016.
The NHHS Baseball Team won the title of city champions in 1957 and 2012, and was a city championships runner-up in 1949, 1980, and 2011.
The NHHS Boys' Basketball Team won the title of city champions in 1990, and was a city championships runner-up in 1959, 1960, 1978, 1991, 2000, and 2003.
The NHHS Girls' Basketball Team won the title of city champions in 2016, and was a runner-up in 1987, 1988, and 1993.
The NHHS Cheerleading Team won 1st place at DREAM TEAM Championships in 2011, 2nd place at YPI's Dance-Drill-Cheer Competition in 2014 and 4th place at City CIF Cheer Championships in 2018.
The NHHS Varsity Football Team was undefeated and league champions in 2004 and 2007.
The NHHS Junior-Varsity Football Team finished 10-1 and were League Champions in the 2017 Season, with two non-consecutive 5 game winning streaks.
The NHHS Girls' Golf Team won the title of city champions in 2010, and won individual champions in 2008 and 2009.
The NHHS Boys' Tennis Team was undefeated and league champions in 2017.
The NHHS Girls' Tennis Team won the title of Division II city champions in 2015.
The NHHS Boys' Volleyball Team won the title of city champions in 2000.
The NHHS Girls' Soccer Team won the title of city champions of Div II in 2020. 
At the LAUSD Band and Drill Team Championships, the NHHS Royal Regiment won 1st place in 1984, 1985, 1986, 1989, 1991, 1993, 1997, 1998, 2001, 2002, 2004, 2018, and 2022.
At the Southern California Band and Orchestra Association marching band circuit, the NHHS Royal Regiment was a finalist in 2004, 2005, and 2006.
At the West Coast Performance Association's Indoor Drumline Championships, the NHHS Indoor Drumline won 1st place in the AA division in 2022.
At the Drums Across California's Indoor Drumline Championships, the NHHS Indoor Drumline won 5th place in 2012, 4th place in 2013, 3rd place in 2014, 2nd place in 2015, 1st place in 2016, 2nd place in 2017, 1st place in 2018, and 1st place in 2019.
At the LAUSD Drumline Championships, the NHHS Indoor Drumline won 2nd place in 2012, 2nd place in 2013, and 4th place in 2014.
In 2011, Mr. Randall Delling was named California Secondary Principal of the Year by the Association of California School Administrators. In 2014, Mr. Jay Gehringer was named LAUSD Teacher of the Year. In 2015, Mr. Altair Maine was named LAUSD Teacher of the Year. In 2016, Ms. Carrie Schwartz was named Secondary Co-Administrator of the Year by the Association of California School Administrators. In 2018, alum Ms. Dorothy Williams-Kohlmeyer was named LAUSD Rookie of the Year.
As of 2022, NHHS has a graduation rate of 95.3%.

Filming Location
NHHS has been the filming location for movies, television shows, and other productions, including the following:

The Human Comedy (1943)
The Rockford Files (1974-1980)
The White Shadow (1978-1981)
Demolition High (1996)
Joan of Arcadia (2003-2005)
The Lockhavens (2009)
The Tudor Tutor (2010)
Shameless S4E9 (2014)
Canaan Land (2020)

Notable alumni

Khalil Abdul-Rahman, music producer
Larry Agran, Irvine City Councilmember, former Mayor, lawyer 
Walt Ambord, American football player, coach
Harry Anderson, actor
Tony Angell, artist, author
Suzan Ball, actress
Brian Baima, American football player
Noah Beery, Jr., actor
Stuart Benjamin, film producer
Richard Beymer, actor
Mayim Bialik, actress
Stefano Bloch, author, academic
Donald "D.J." Bonebrake, musician
Perry Botkin Jr., musician, composer, producer
Ron Brand, former Major League baseball player
Michael Broggie, author, historian
Barbara Brogliatti, public relations, marketing executive
Philip Brown, actor
Bill Cable, actor, model
Christy Canyon, actress
Cindy Carol, actress
Adam Carolla, comedian
Nick Cassavetes, director, actor
Sydney Chaplin, actor
Andrei Cherny, author, politician, banker
Lenora Claire, media personality
Bert Convy, actor, singer, game show host
Jordan Cronenweth, cinematographer
Gary Crosby, actor, singer
Robert DeHaven, Air Force colonel
Sandy Descher, child actress
Dean Devlin, producer, writer, actor
Maureen Dragone, journalist, author and founder of the Young Artist Awards
Denis Dutton, media activist, web entrepreneur
David Eisley, musician
Michael Erush, soccer player, coach
Edan Everly, musician
Shelley Fabares, actress
Stanley Fafara, actor
Tiger Fafara, actor
Brent Fischer, composer/arranger
George Frenn, Olympian
Rob Friedman, co-chairman of Lionsgate Motion Picture Group
Ernestine Fu, venture capital investor, author
Gil Garfield, musician
Carrington Garland, actress
Teri Garr, actress
Cuba Gooding Jr., actor
Omar Gooding, actor
Farley Granger, actor
Brian Austin Green, actor
Bruce Guerin, child actor, pianist
Ruben Guevara, musician
Bob Gurr, amusement ride designer
Don Hahn, film producer
Khrystyne Haje, actress
Alyson Hannigan, actress
David Harper, actor
Emery Hawkins, animator
Roberta Haynes, actress
Jamake Highwater, writer, journalist
William Hohri, activist
Desiree Horton, TV personality, helicopter pilot
Julia Hu, technology entrepreneur
Michael Hutchence, musician, lead singer of Australian band INXS
Sasha Jenson, actor
Andy Johnson, former NBA player
Chuck Jones, animator, director
Dana Jones, basketball player
Janet Julian, actress
Gary Kibbe, cinematographer
Josh "Andrew" Koenig, actor
Jonathan Kovacs, singer
Eva Lee Kuney, actress, dancer
Alan Ladd, actor
Louis Landon, pianist
Arthur Lee, basketball player
Jonah Lehrer, author
Pam Ling, physician, castmate on The Real World: San Francisco
Barry Livingston, actor
Stanley Livingston, actor
Donald Losby, actor
Marlon Lucky, American football player
Heather MacRae, vocalist, actress
Meredith MacRae, actress
Brett Marx, actor, producer
Ralph Mauriello. former Major League baseball player
Oliver Mayer, playwright, screenwriter, author
Mike McDonald, former NFL player
Elizabeth McGovern, actress, musician
Jake McLaughlin, actor
Nick McLean, cinematographer
Jimmy McNichol, actor
Nick Menza, drummer/percussionist
Martin Milner, actor
Aaron Mitchell, former NFL player
Rolando Molina, actor
Johanna Moore, computer scientist
Erin Moran, actress
Susan Morrow, actress
Michael Nassir, astronomer
Ken Osmond, actor
Karen Pendleton, original Mouseketeer
Gerald Pulley, U.S. Navy photographer
Eduard Punset, Spanish politician, lawyer, economist, science popularizer
Alan Robbins, politician
Carlos Romero, ice skater, actor
Bob Ronka, Los Angeles City Council member, 1977–81
Barbara Ruick, actress, singer
Jennifer Runyon, actress
Maia Sharp, singer, songwriter
Amy Sherman-Palladino, producer, director, writer
Robert Shields, mime, actor
Daniel Smith, son of Anna Nicole Smith
Shawnee Smith, actress, musician
Susan Sontag, author, theorist, activist
Joshua Stangby, NFL/CFL wide receiver
Mary Kay Stearns, actress
Robert Stebbins, biologist, illustrator
Charles Joel Stone, statistician and mathematician
Stephen Stromberg, journalist
Guy Sularz, former Major League baseball player
Beth Sullivan, screenwriter, executive producer
Robert Swink, film editor
Anthony Sydes, actor, Purple Heart recipient
Margaret Talbot, essayist
Russ Tamblyn, actor, dancer
Buck Taylor, actor, painter
Anthony 'Scooter' Teague, actor, dancer
Michael Tilson Thomas, musician, composer, director of the San Francisco Symphony
Eugene Tissot, Jr., U.S. Navy Rear Admiral
Ronne Troup, actress
Ron Unz, entrepreneur, political activist
Benny Urquidez, kickboxer
Morgan Webb, TV personality
Julius Wechter, bandleader of Baja Marimba Band
Eugene Wescott, geophysicist
Jim Wheeler, politician
De'voreaux White, actor
John Williams, composer, conductor, pianist
Melanie Wilson, actress
Lauren Woodland, actress, attorney
Scott Yancey, TV personality
Charles Yukl, ragtime pianist, murderer

References

External links

North Hollywood High School website
Articles about "North Hollywood High School" - Los Angeles Times

Magnet schools in California
Los Angeles Unified School District schools
Educational institutions established in 1927
High schools in the San Fernando Valley
High schools in Los Angeles
Public high schools in California
North Hollywood, Los Angeles
1927 establishments in California